Mark Warren (born 12 November 1974) is an English former professional footballer.

Biography
Born in Lower Clapton, London, Warren started his career at Leyton Orient. He was voted Orient's player of the year in 1996–97, but the following year was loaned out to Oxford United, for whom he made four appearances.

In January 1999 he was signed by Notts County for £30,000. After three years in Nottingham, he signed for Colchester United in August 2002, before moving to Southend United in June 2003.

In July 2004 he dropped into non-League and signed for Fisher Athletic. In 2006, he moved to King's Lynn to play under former Orient manager Tommy Taylor, and captained the club to the Southern League title in 2008.

In September 2009 he signed for AFC Sudbury, but left the club after a single appearance and retired from football.

Honours

Club
Southend United
 Football League Trophy Runner-up (1): 2003–04

King's Lynn
 Southern Football League Winner (1): 2007–08

References

External links

1974 births
People from Lower Clapton
Leyton Orient F.C. players
Oxford United F.C. players
Notts County F.C. players
Colchester United F.C. players
Southend United F.C. players
Fisher Athletic F.C. players
King's Lynn F.C. players
A.F.C. Sudbury players
Living people
Association football defenders
English footballers
Footballers from the London Borough of Hackney